Ilnur Flyurovich Mukhametdinov (born 12 July 1985) is a former Russian professional football player.

Club career
He played in the Russian Football National League for FC Volga Ulyanovsk in 2008.

External links
 

1985 births
Living people
Russian footballers
Association football defenders
FC KAMAZ Naberezhnye Chelny players
FC Volga Ulyanovsk players